Oh, What a World: Tour II was the fifth concert tour and second instalment of the "Oh, What a World: Tour"  by American singer-songwriter Kacey Musgraves in support of her studio album, Golden Hour (2018). It began on  August 20, 2019 in Las Vegas, and travelled all across North America. It ended in Nashville on October 25, 2019, comprising 30 shows. Poolside, Yola, Weyes Blood and Lucius served as opening acts during the tour, while Maggie Rogers served as a one night only support for the tour ending their tours together in the same venue.

Set list 
This set list is representative of the show on August 20, 2022, in Las Vegas. It is not representative of all concerts for the duration of the tour.
 "Slow Burn"
 "Wonder Woman"
 "Butterflies"
 "Lonely Weekend"
 "Happy & Sad"
 "Merry Go 'Round"
 "High Time"
 "Golden Hour"
 "Mother" 
 "Oh, What a World"
 "Family Is Family"
 "Love Is a Wild Thing"
 "Velvet Elvis"
 "I Will Survive" (Gloria Gaynor cover)
 "Space Cowboy"
 "Follow Your Arrow"
 "Rainbow"
 "High Horse"

Notes
 Starting with the first show in Los Angeles, a cover of Brooks & Dunn's "Neon Moon" was added to the set list.
 During the shows in Boston, Charlottesville, the first show in Irving, New York City & Nashville, "Neon Moon" was not played.
 Starting with the show in Cary, "I Will Survive" was replaced with a Whitney Houston cover of "I Wanna Dance With Somebody (Who Loves Me)".
 During the shows in Asheville, "I Will Survive" was played in place of "I Wanna Dance With Somebody", "Neon Moon" was not played. 
 During the shows in New Orleans, Yola joined Musgraves on stage to perform "I Will Survive". "I Wanna Dance With Somebody" was not played.
 During the show in Nashville, Maggie Rogers joined Musgraves on stage to perform "I Wanna Dance With Somebody". Harry Styles joined Musgraves on stage to perform "Space Cowboy".

Shows

Cancelled shows

Personnel 
 Kacey Musgraves - lead vocals, acoustic guitar, banjo, mandolin and harmonica
 Scott Quintana - drums, percussion and spoons
 Adam Keafer - bass
 Kai Welch - guitar, keyboards, & background vocals
 Nathaniel Smith - cello, keyboards & background vocals
 Kyle Ryan - guitar, banjo, vocals & musical director
 Smokin' Brett Resnick - pedal steel guitar

Notes

References 

2019 concert tours
Concert tours of North America
Concert tours of the United States